Qorlortorsuaq Dam is a hydroelectric dam near Qorlortorsuaq in the Nanortalik district of the Kujalleq municipality in southern Greenland. It has a capacity of 7.2 MW and it generates power for the neighbouring towns of Qaqortoq and Narsaq.

History
The construction of the power plant started in December 2003 and was completed in October 2007.  It was built by consortium of E. Pihl & Son AS (51%), YIT (34%), and Landsvirkjun (15%).  Landsvirkjun operates the power plant until 2012, when operation will be transferred to the Kujalleq municipality.  The design and engineering was performed by Icelandic companies Verkís and Efla.

Description
It creates a reservoir with a capacity of 108 million cubic meters.

The power plant as two horizontal axis Francis turbines manufactured by Kössler with a total installed capacity of 7.6 MW.  Its annual generation is 27 GWh.  A crew of four maintains the power plant.

Green Power program
The hydropower plant is part of the plan of the Greenland Home Rule government to replace fossil fuelled energy production and storage with sustainable power production.

References

Hydroelectric power stations in Greenland
Dams in Greenland
Dams completed in 2007
Gravity dams
Energy infrastructure completed in 2007
Kujalleq
2007 establishments in Greenland